Tevita Amone (born 8 July 1980) is a Tongan former professional rugby league footballer who played for the Western Suburbs Magpies and the North Queensland Cowboys in the National Rugby League, primarily as a .

Playing career
Born in Tonga, Amone represented New South Wales under-17 in 1997 while playing for the Western Suburbs Magpies SG Ball Cup side. In 1999, he represented the Junior Kiwis.

In Round 3 of the 1999 NRL season, he made his NRL debut as an 18-year old in the Magpies' 6–60 defeat by the Penrith Panthers.

In 2000, he played for the Magpies' First Division side, spending two and a half seasons with the side.

In June 2002, Amone was signed by the North Queensland Cowboys, playing three games for them during the 2002 NRL season. He was released by the club at the end of the season.

Personal life
Amone's nephew, Manase Fainu, has played for the Manly Warringah Sea Eagles.

References

Living people
1980 births
Tongan rugby league players
Western Suburbs Magpies players
North Queensland Cowboys players
Junior Kiwis players
Rugby league props